Mike's Drive-In is a small chain of drive-in restaurants, based in the U.S. state of Oregon. There are currently restaurants in Milwaukie and Oregon City; previously, Mike's also operated in Portland. The third location of the chain opened in Tigard.

History

Mike Martin opened the original restaurant at the intersection of 47th Avenue and East Burnside Street in Portland in 1971, followed by the Milwaukie location in 1973. Current owner Todd Freeman purchased the business in March 1984. The Sellwood restaurant in Portland (Southeast 17th and Tenino Street) opened in 1986 and was demolished . The Oregon City restaurant opened on August 10, 1989 and underwent a renovation in 2016.

The Milwaukie restaurant was damaged by a fire in 2020. The Milwaukie and Oregon City restaurants closed indoor dining and operated via takeout during the COVID-19 pandemic. A third location is slated to open in Tigard.

Reception
Michael Russell ranked Mike's number 4 on The Oregonian 2011 list of the Portland metropolitan area's best "classic" burgers.
In 2020, Portland Monthly writers ranked Mike's and other "old school" restaurants number 16 on a list of Portland's 20 best cheeseburgers. Brooke Jackson-Glidden and Alex Frane of Eater Portland have described Mike's as "an iconic Oregon restaurant for burgers, fries and soft serve".

See also

 List of drive-in restaurants
 List of restaurant chains in the United States

References

External links

 

1971 establishments in Oregon
Defunct restaurants in Portland, Oregon
Drive-in restaurants
Milwaukie, Oregon
Restaurants in Oregon City, Oregon
Restaurant chains in the United States
Restaurants established in 1971
Restaurants in Oregon
Sellwood-Moreland, Portland, Oregon